Valdenia Camille "Val" Winn (born December 7, 1950) is an American Democratic member of the Kansas House of Representatives, representing the 34th district. She has served since 2001.

Since 1972, Winn has worked as a professor at Kansas City Kansas Community College.  Dr. Winn currently serves as the Vice President of the Kansas City Kansas Public Schools Board of Education.

Early life and education
Winn received a bachelor's degree in Secondary Education (1972), a Master's in History, and a PhD (1994) History from the University of Kansas.

Career
Winn is currently the chairman/treasurer for the Northeast Coalition, treasurer for the Northeast Cooperative Council, and a member of the Struggler's Hill/Roots Neighborhood Association.

She is a member of the Governor's Council on Travel & Tourism, and a previous member of the Health for All Kansas Steering Commission, Kansas Incorporated Strategic Planning Steering Committee, Governor's Council on Development of Including Kansas, and Kansas Sesquicentennial Steering Commission.

In March 2015, Republicans proposed ejecting her from the legislature, after she'd referred to actions taken by Republican colleagues as "racist." The bill would have denied lower in-state tuition to undocumented immigrants. Winn, the ranking Democrat on the committee considering the proposed legislation explained her  objections to it. "This is a racist, sexist, fear-mongering bill." "I would like first to apologize to the progressively-minded people of Kansas who are appalled that we are turning back the hands of time." She characterized the proponents as employing, "Jim Crow tactics, once again making Kansas a laughingstock." She apologized, "...to the students and their parents whose lives are being hijacked by the racist bigots who support this bill."

Elections

From 2008 through 2020, Winn had no opposition in the primaries or in the general elections. In 2015, she also ran for Kansas City Kansas Public Schools Board, winning a four-year term.

Committee membership
 Health and Human Services
 Education
 Higher Education (Ranking Member)
 Joint Committee on Children's Issues
 Joint Committee on Economic Development

Major campaign donors
Top donors to Winn's 2008 campaign:
1. Winn, Valdenia 	$1,684
2. Kansans for Lifesaving Cures 	$750
3. Kansas Contractors Assoc 	$600
4. Carpenters District Council of Kansas City 	$500
5. Astrazeneca 	$500

References

External links
 Kansas Legislature - Valdenia Winn
 Project Vote Smart profile
 Kansas Votes profile
 State Surge - Legislative and voting track record
 Follow the Money campaign contributions:
 2002, 2004, 2006, 2008

Democratic Party members of the Kansas House of Representatives
1950 births
Living people
Women state legislators in Kansas
University of Kansas alumni
Politicians from Kansas City, Kansas
African-American women in politics
African-American state legislators in Kansas
21st-century American politicians
21st-century American women politicians
21st-century African-American women
21st-century African-American politicians
20th-century African-American people
20th-century African-American women